Gymnostylus latifrons is a species of beetle in the family Cerambycidae. It was described by Stephan von Breuning in 1970. It is known from the Central African Republic, Cameroon, and the Democratic Republic of the Congo.

References

Pachystolini
Beetles described in 1970
Taxa named by Stephan von Breuning (entomologist)